The Bray Road Beast is a 2018 American documentary film about the Beast of Bray Road, a purported humanoid wolf-life creature allegedly sighted in Elkhorn, Walworth County, Wisconsin. Directed and co-produced by Seth Breedlove, the film is the seventh documentary by his production company Small Town Monsters. It is narrated by Lyle Blackburn and features both animated sequences and live-action reenactments of alleged sightings of the titular cryptid. The music for the film was composed by Brandon Dalo and Underoath member Chris Dudley.

The Bray Road Beast was released on DVD and streaming services on October 5, 2018.

Production
The Bray Road Beast was financed in part by a crowdfunding campaign on the website Kickstarter, which production company Small Town Monsters launched in February 2018 in order to raise funds for both The Bray Road Beast and two other documentaries, The Flatwoods Monster: A Legacy of Fear and On the Trail of Champ.

Release and reception
The Bray Road Beast was released on DVD and streaming services on October 5, 2018. It later screened at the 14th annual Texas Frightmare Weekend in May 2019.

A reviewer for Wisconsin Frights wrote positively of the documentary, comparing its visual style to that of Hammer Horror films and calling it "unnerving and completely fascinating." Christine Burnham of PopHorror referred to the film as "overall interesting", though she criticized the special effects used to portray the titular creature as "crude and [...] a little silly".

References

External links
 
 

2018 films
2018 documentary films
2010s English-language films